Yimaia is a extinct genus of Ginkgoalean tree, and the only member of the family Yimaiaceae. In botanical form classification, its a form taxon for ginkgoalean ovulate organs. Yimaia species are distinguished from other Ginkgoales by the presence of "Ovulate organs consisting of a peduncle and up to eight or nine terminal, sessile, contiguous and orthotropous (straight, upright and with a micropyle at apex) ovules." The ovules are associated with leaves of either Baiera or Ginkgoites leaf morphospecies. Fossils have been found in Middle Jurassic deposits in China.

Species
 Yimaia capituliformis Zhou, Zheng and Zhang, 2006 Daohugou Bed, China, Callovian Associated with leaves of Ginkgoites type
Yimaia qinghaiensis Wu, Yang and Zhou, 2006 Shimengou Formation, Qinghai, China, Middle Jurassic Associated with leaves of Baiera furcata type.
 Yimaia recurva (type) Zhou et Zhang, 1988 Yima Formation, Henan, China, Middle Jurassic

References

Ginkgophyta